Varronia leucophlyctis, synonym Cordia leucophlyctis, is a shrubby plant in the borage family (Boraginaceae), endemic to the Galápagos Islands. It has tubular white flowers.

References

Boraginaceae
Endemic flora of Galápagos